The Gloaming 3 (also referred to as "3") is the third studio album by the contemporary Irish/American music group The Gloaming. It was released on February 22, 2019.

Content
“Bronwyn Leigh,” which opens the set titled “Doctor O’Neill” was composed by Scottish fiddler Ryan McKasson.

Many of the album’s lyrics are sourced from extant poems:

 “My Lady Who Has Found The Tomb Unattended, is a 17th-century poem by Eoghan Ruadh mac Uilliam Óig Mhic an Bháird.
  “Áthas,” is a poem written by Liam Ó Muirthile.
 “Reo” is a poem written by Seán Ó Ríordáin, with additional lyrics from Ó Lionáird.

Release and reception
The Gloaming 3 was released February 2019 to positive reviews.

In its favorable review, The Irish Times located the album at the "intersection where unapologetically traditional music-making sits so comfortably alongside the most visionary, forward-facing musical exploration."

Hot Press called the album  "transcendent," and "even more beautiful than the previous two records."

Written in Music called it "exceptional... [an] insanely good album [from]  one of the most important bands of our time."

Folk Radio called it "a bold, beguiling, magnificent album."

Track listing
Credits are adapted from the album's liner notes. Information in brackets indicates individual tunes featured on a track.

Personnel
Music
 Iarla Ó Lionáird – vocals
 Caoimhín Ó Raghallaigh – Hardanger d'Amore
 Dennis Cahill – guitar
 Martin Hayes – fiddle
 Thomas Bartlett – piano

Production
 Produced by Thomas Bartlett 
 Engineered & Mixed by Patrick Dillett
 Additional engineering by James Yost
 Recorded at Reservoir Studios, New York 
 Mastered by UE Nastasi at Sterling Sound 
 Published by Real World Works Ltd. 
 Management by BARQUE LLC
 Design by Real World
 Cover Image by Robert and Shana ParkeHarrison
 Inside Photograph by Heidi Solander

References 

2019 albums
Real World Records albums
The Gloaming albums
Celtic music groups
Irish folk musical groups